A highway shield or route marker is a sign denoting the route number of a highway, usually in the form of a symbolic shape with the route number enclosed. As the focus of the sign, the route number is usually the sign's largest element, with other items on the sign rendered in smaller sizes or contrasting colors.  Highway shields are used by travellers, commuters, and all levels of government for identifying, navigating, and organising routes within a county, state, province, or country. Simplified highway shields often appear on maps.

Purposes 
There are several distinct uses for the highway shield:
 Junction signs inform travelers that they are approaching an intersection with a numbered highway.
 Guide signs inform travelers which way to go at intersections, usually with an arrow pointing the way. These include:
 Directional assemblies, which combine highway shields with separate cardinal direction signs and arrow signs on the same post, and
 Direction, position, or indication signs, which include highway shields as part of the sign legend.
 Reassurance markers are used after major junctions and periodically in between to confirm the route and direction. 
 Trailblazer assemblies are posted on other roadways to "blaze the trail" to the highway in question, usually with a "TO" banner plate above the shield
 Some jurisdictions place highway shields on highway location markers (kilometre or mile markers).
 At complex interchanges, route shield pavement markings help motorists get into the correct lane.

Highway shields by country

Australia

Australia has maintained distinctly different trends pertaining to highway shields in the past and will continue in this vein somewhat, despite the conversion to alpha-numeric routes and shields. Alpha-numeric route numbering has been in use in Tasmania since the 1970s, and was introduced in the mainland states from 1996, with the state of Victoria being the first to implement the policy on the mainland.

Prior to this conversion and concurrently, Federal Highway (gold-on-green squared-off bullet), National Highway (black-on-white squared-off bullet), State Highway (blue bullet) and Tourist Route (white-on-brown rounded pentagon) shields existed. In Victoria Freeway shields were used (white-on-green with 'F' prefix) until the late 1980s, while during the 1990s Queensland and New South Wales implemented a hexagonal blue-on-white Metroad system of urban arterial routes. The Western Ring Road (now M80) in Melbourne initially used a shield quite similar to the U.S. Interstate shield, albeit with 'Ring Road' written instead of 'Interstate' and with 2 peaks rather than 3.

To further complicate matters, with the introduction of the alpha-numeric system, roads that are federally funded (or Federal Highways) have a squared-off bullet encompassing the alpha-numeric designation. Freeways and dual-carriageway roads often use an 'M' prefix, particularly in Victoria. In addition, trapezoidal signs are placed every 5 km on major regional highways and freeways indicating the distance to the post office of the next city or major town on the route. These signs usually only have the first letter of the destination; two or three letters are used if there is ambiguity between nearby towns or when the place name consists of two words.

Brazil

Federal and state highways shields are standardized in Brazil by the National Transit Department (DENATRAN), but implementation is not always consistent nor even existent. In many states, highway names appear on highway location markers and guide signs with no highway shield.

Canada

Each province dictates the type of shields used as highway transportation is a provincial responsibility. However, the green and white signage for the Trans-Canada Highway is used nationwide. Each province has their own shape for the sign, though.

Alberta
Shields for core highways in Alberta use black route number on a white squared-off bullet, while shields for local highways (500-986) use black route number on a white oval. Both variants feature the provincial wordmark across the top, although it may be omitted on certain guide signs.

British Columbia
Standard shields for highways in British Columbia use blue route number on a white bullet, with the provincial shield of arms placed at the top. Certain highways (e.g. Crowsnest Highway, Southern Yellowhead Highway and Nisga'a Highway) use their own variations on the default provincial highway shield.

Ontario
Major or 400-series highways in Ontario have different kinds of shields depending on usage:
 Roadside reassurance markers take the shape of a bullet with a crown on top. Default colour scheme is black text on white background, although the Queen Elizabeth Way uses blue "QEW" on gold, and provincially-maintained toll highways (407, 412 and 418) use white route numbers on blue. These shields used to be emblazoned with "The King's Highway" across the top, but the wording has been removed since the 1990s.
 Markers on guide signs take the shape of a crown silhouette, with the route number placed within.

The exception is the private 407 Express Toll Route, which uses black route number on a white oval marker for both purposes.

Secondary provincial highways use an isosceles trapezoid as markers, while tertiary provincial highway markers use a rectangle with rounded corners.

Numbered roads maintained by Ontario's counties, regional municipalities and single-tier municipalities use an inverted isosceles trapezoid as markers. Default colour scheme is black text on white background, although certain jurisdictions use their own colour combinations (e.g. white on blue in Niagara, gold on black in Peel, and gold on green in Halton).

On the other hand, instead of an inverted trapezoid, the single-tier city of Toronto uses a roundel for its municipally-maintained freeways, the Gardiner Expressway and the Don Valley Parkway. The design is two-tone gold-on-green, with the road name in white on the green outer ring, and either the cardinal direction (for reassurance markers) or an arrow (for guidance to the freeway) in black on the gold inner disc. The city's other roads, such as Allen Road, do not have their own shields.

Quebec
Shields for controlled-access autoroutes in Quebec use white route number on a blue bullet, with a white stylised drawing of a dual carriageway and an overpass on red across the top. Other provincial routes use white route number on a green French shield with three white fleur-de-lys across the top, while forest routes use white route number on a blue French shield with three white stylised trees across the top.

Germany
German Autobahns as the nation's federal controlled-access highway system use a blue shield with slanted edges and white lettering. Other federal highways use a yellow shield with black lettering. The color schemes mirror the country’s directional signange coloring system on these two types of roads.

Hong Kong
The Hong Kong Strategic Route and Exit Number System states that the standard shield should consist of a yellow, bullet-shaped shield with the route number in black color. It is used on all numbered routes in Hong Kong.

Japan

The national highways of Japan use a triangular blue shield with a white route number. The expressways use a rectangular green shield with a white letter and number combination with the name of the route written in Japanese and English. Routes on urban expressways are signed with a green shield with white numbers. The Shuto Expressway system also uses this sign but with the route name written in kanji-characters above the number. Prefecture-maintained routes use a hexagonal blue shield with a white route number, letter, or combination of both.

Malaysia

According to the Manual on Traffic Control Devices Standard Traffic Signs archived by Malaysian Public Works Department, a standard Malaysian highway shield consists of a yellow hexagon shield with black border line which resembles the Public Works Department's logo itself. The highway shield standard is used for all expressways, federal and state roads in Malaysia, which can be distinguished through the numbering scheme used (please refer to the Road signs in Malaysia article for details).

New Zealand

New Zealand shields are similar to the bullet-shaped markers used in Hong Kong, but are red rather than yellow.

South Africa
The Southern African Development Community Road Traffic Signs Manual specifies designs for "confirmation route markers" for numbered national, provincial, regional and metropolitan routes. The national route marker is pentagonal, the provincial route marker is diamond-shaped, and the regional and metropolitan route markers are rectangular. The background is blue when used on a freeway and green for other roads. There is a white border and the lettering is yellow.

South Korea
The expressway shields are shaped like U.S. Highway shields and colored like Interstate shields with red, white and blue, the colors of the flag of South Korea. The national route shields are a blue oval, and local route shields are a yellow square.

Taiwan

The national highway shields are in the shape of the Prunus mume, the national flower of Taiwan. Provincial highways have triangular shields similar in shape to that of the national highways of Japan, with different colored backgrounds to distinguish between ordinary roads and expressways. The county and city highways have a square shield, while its spur roads as well as township and district roads have rectangular ones.

United States

The United States' Manual on Uniform Traffic Control Devices (MUTCD) gives standard designs for highways in the Interstate Highway System and U.S. Route system. The Interstate shield is the only trademarked highway marker in use in the United States, and the U.S. Route shield was inspired by the Great Seal of the United States. The MUTCD also provides default designs for state highways (the circular highway shield) and county highways (a blue pentagon with yellow text). However, states are free to use any design for their numbered routes;  only five states (Delaware, Iowa, Kentucky, Mississippi, and New Jersey) use the default shield on their primary systems, and all others use a custom design. Oklahoma used the default until 2006, when it changed to a state outline. Maryland uses the default sporadically for locally maintained sections of state-numbered highways, most often in Baltimore, but otherwise uses a different design. Virginia and West Virginia use the default for their secondary state routes but different designs for their primary state routes. There are several additional designs used in the other states and territories. State outlines are used for primary numbered routes in Alabama, Arizona, Arkansas, Florida, Georgia, Idaho, Louisiana, Missouri, Nevada, new signs in North Dakota, Ohio, and Oklahoma, and for secondary numbered routes in Texas. Tennessee and South Carolina also incorporate state outlines into their shields. Other options include basic geometric shapes besides a circle (like squares in Illinois and Indiana, and diamonds in Michigan and North Carolina), or a design representing the state (like Pennsylvania's keystone design, Utah's beehive, Kansas' sunflower, and New Hampshire's Old Man of the Mountain). Washington uses a silhouette of George Washington's bust. New Mexico uses the default circle but adds a Zia sun symbol inside the circle around the number. Every state but California uses a square or rectangular sign for its state highways, mainly to save money on both custom cutting and to be contained on a rectangular sign with other route markers. Wisconsin's symbol is a nod to its former triangular shields, while utilizing a second rectangular outline to better fit a number at full-height. Some U.S. counties and townships also have unique shield designs, though most use the MUTCD default.

Alternatives to shields

Many countries worldwide, such as the United Kingdom and France, do not use shields, instead relying on text representations of highway numbers. Road numbers (the term "highway" is not in general use in the UK) are prefixed by a letter indicating the type of road, for example M1, A1, B123 in the UK; A1, N1, D1 in France. These are sometimes highlighted with a different background color, depending on the class of highway and the context of the sign. The Vienna Convention on Road Signs and Signals specifies that "road identification signs" consist of the route number framed in a rectangle, a shield, or the relevant state's route classification symbol (if one exists).   The extent to which such signs are used varies between countries.

In the United States, route shield pavement markings sometimes accompany physical highway shield signs or serve as replacements for them.

References

External links

Traffic signs